Nicolae Orval Gropeanu or, in French, Nicolas Gropeano (28 November 1863, Bacău - 6 January 1936, Paris) was a Romanian painter, pastelist and illustrator; probably of Jewish ancestry. He is known primarily for genre scenes, portraits and figures. Other variations on his name as it appears in official documents include Nicolae Gropper, Naia Groper and Noah Gropper.

Biography
He studied with Theodor Aman and Constantin Stăncescu, who was better known as an art critic. According to Jacques Doucet, a noted art collector, Gropeanu's debut at the Salon was very successful and the critics praised him as one of the best young Romanian painters. They were especially impressed with his pastels of children's portraits and oriental scenes.

For many years, he provided drawings to Le Figaro Illustré and later created illustrations for the stories of Elena Văcărescu.

Although he remained in Paris, he participated in exhibitions at home, notably at the "", an artists' association founded by Nicolae Vermont and Ștefan Luchian, and two solo exhibitions at the Romanian Athenaeum in 1909 and 1912. In 1935, he was named a Knight in the Legion of Honour.

Several of his works were purchased by the French government. The existence of numerous Orientalist works would suggest that he travelled through North Africa and the Middle East at some unknown date.

References

Further reading
 Tudor Octavian, Pictori români uitați, NOI Mediaprint, 2003 
 Gabriel Badea-Păun, Pictori romani in Franta 1834-1939, NOI Mediaprint, 2012

External links

ArtNet: More works by Gropeanu.

1863 births
1936 deaths
19th-century Romanian painters
20th-century Romanian painters
Pastel artists
Romanian emigrants to France
Recipients of the Legion of Honour
People from Bacău